is a rural district in Miyagi Prefecture, in the Tōhoku region of northern Japan. As of 2017, the district had an estimated population of 42,681 and a population density of 116 persons per km2. The total area was 367.82 km2.

The district is a home to Miyagi University, and the main campus of the university is called Kurokawa campus after its location.

The city of Tomiya was formerly part of Kurokawa District. At present, the district consists of:

Towns and villages
Ōsato
Taiwa
Ōhira

History
The area of Kurokawa District was within Mutsu Province and was under the control of the Date clan of Sendai Domain under the Tokugawa shogunate. In 1869, following the Meiji restoration, Mutsu Province was divided, with the area of Kurokawa District becoming part of Rikuzen Province, and from 1872, part of Miyagi Prefecture. In the establishment of the modern municipalities system, the district was organized into one town (Yoshioka) and nine villages (Ōhira (大衡村), Yoshida (吉田村), Miyatoko (宮床村), Tomiya (富谷村), Tsurusu (鶴巣村), Ōya (大谷村), Kasukawa (粕川村), Ōmatsuzawa (大松沢村), Ochiai (落合村)).

1 April 1894 District offices established in Yoshioka Town
1 July 1926 District offices abolished
1 July 1954 Ōmatsuzawa, Ōya and Kasakawa merged to form Ōsato village
20 April 1955 Yoshioka, Ochiai, Tsurusu, Miyatoko and Yoshida merge to form Taiwa Town
1 April 1959 Ōsato elevated to town status
1 April 1963 Tomiya elevated to town status
10 October 2016 Tomiya elevated to city status

Districts in Miyagi Prefecture